The Pan-African National Party (PDP) is a political party in Togo. The party participated in the October 2007 parliamentary election, but did not win any seats. In 2013 legislative election, Sambrini Targone won the party single seat in the Denkpen prefecture.

References

Pan-Africanism in Togo
Pan-Africanist political parties in Africa
Political parties in Togo